Esperanto, released in 1993, was the first studio album by Elektric Music, initially a collaboration of Karl Bartos (formerly of Kraftwerk) and Lothar Manteuffel (formerly of Rheingold), but later only Bartos worked under this name. The project begun after Bartos ended his involvement with Kraftwerk in 1991. The songs "Show Business" and "Kissing the Machine" were co-written with Andy McCluskey of Orchestral Manoeuvres in the Dark, with McCluskey performing vocals on the latter track. "Crosstalk" and "Overdrive" were co-written with Kraftwerk associate Emil Schult, who was also the art director of the cover graphics of the early Elektric Music releases.

About half the songs are similar to Kraftwerk, and the others more to contemporary techno. Many Kraftwerk fans were dissatisfied by the techno elements, while others claimed the album was an unexpected masterpiece. Later Kraftwerk releases would, however, feature similar elements.

Reception

Allmusic gives the album a four out of five star rating, commenting "A fine slice of electronica, Esperanto demonstrates that in 1993, the teacher was quite willing to learn some things from his students."

Track listing

Release history

References

1993 debut albums
Karl Bartos albums
Atlantic Records albums